Stockoceros is an extinct genus of the North American artiodactyl family Antilocapridae (pronghorns), known from Mexico and the southwestern United States. Its horns are each divided near their base into two prongs of roughly equal length.

The genus survived until about 12,000 years ago, and was present when Paleo-Indians reached North America.

Dental microwear studies suggest that S. onusrosagris was a mixed feeder (both grazing and browsing) with a greater intake of grass into its diet than living pronghorn.

One of the co-discoverers and co-describers of S. onusrosagris was Quentin Roosevelt II, grandson of Theodore Roosevelt; he was 14 at the time of the discovery.

References

Prehistoric pronghorns
Prehistoric even-toed ungulate genera
Extinct mammals of North America
Pleistocene mammals of North America
Fossil taxa described in 1942